Parzegan, also rendered as Parzehgan, may refer to:
 Parzegan-e Kharraj
 Parzegan-e Sofla